Sar-e Mahur (also Romanized as Sar-e Māhūr; also known as Sar Mūr) is a village in Dehdasht-e Gharbi Rural District, in the Central District of Kohgiluyeh County, Kohgiluyeh and Boyer-Ahmad Province, Iran. At the 2006 census, its population was 114, in 23 families.

References 

Populated places in Kohgiluyeh County